Leigh Carriage is an Australian vocalist, educator and songwriter. Her festival performances include the Monterey Jazz Festival, Wangaratta Jazz and Blues Festival, Melbourne Women’s Jazz Festival, Brisbane International Jazz Festival and the Brisbane Festival. Carriage's 2013 album Mandarin Skyline, mixed and mastered by Grammy Award winner Helik Hadir, was nominated for a National Australian Jazz Bell Award, and Weave (2016) won NCEIA Album of the Year.

Carriage is a senior lecturer in the Contemporary Music Program at Southern Cross University, where she has specialised in songwriting, arranging, vocal pedagogy and ensemble direction since 1998. Since 1999 Carriage has coordinated a Visiting Artists mentoring program for Women in Contemporary Music, and the APRA AMCOS Songwriting Workshop Series for 17 years. In 2009, Carriage was awarded a Citation for Outstanding Contribution to Student Learning by the Vice Chancellor, and in 2019 she was nominated for an Impact Award for Professional Service. She was awarded a PhD in Composition from The University of Sydney Conservatorium of Music for a dissertation that broadly encompassed her research interests in composition, performance, improvisation, collaboration and recording. In 2022 Leigh was awarded the Australian Women in Music - Humanitarian Award.

Discography

as leader 

 Weave (2016): Independent - winner of Album of the Year -  NCEIA Jazz Category Review
 Mandarin Skyline (2013): Vitamin Records - (national and international reviews). 
 Get Out Of Town (2012): Vitamin Records.
 On Impulse (2006): [Live]:Independent reviewed in ABC Limelight Magazine (October Issue, 2006) by John Shand.
 Until (2004): Independent.
 Just Before Dawn (2000): Rosebank Records. 
 Liquid (2000): Independent.

as contributor 
 Jo Jo Smith, Live At The Blue Birdy (2009)
 Carl Cleves, Before Twilight Turns to Night (2018)

Publications

Books 
 Carriage, L. (2021) Weave: Complete transcriptions for piano and vocal. Wagtail Books, Australia.
 Carriage, L. (2021) Mandarin Skyline: Complete Piano and Vocal Transcriptions. Wagtail Books, Australia.

Book chapters 
 Heartlands: Kasey Chambers, Australian Country Music and Americana in Outback and Urban: Australian Country Music Volume 1. Australian Institute of Country Music Press: Gympie Queensland Australia

Journals 
 Carriage, L. and Wren, T., (2021) The Jazz Social: Jazz performance during COVID. Perfect Beat, 21(2), pp. 159–164.
 Carriage, L. (2019) Hybridity in the Music of Youn Sun Nah: Directions in Jazz Vocal Style, Australian Voice, Vol. 20, p. 1–7.
 Carriage, L. (2008) Southern Cross welcomes Katie Noonan, Voice of Australian National Association of Teachers of Singing, Vol. 21, no. 2, p. 4–5.
 Carriage, L. (2000) The Experience of Contemporary Australian Female Vocalists: An Exploratory Study. Australian Voice. 6: 31–36

Articles  
https://theconversation.com/profiles/leigh-carriage-456522/articles

 Carriage, L. (2022) Dissecting Stevie Wonder’s Superstition, 50 years after we first heard its infectious grooves. The Conversation: In-depth analysis, research, news and ideas from leading academics and researchers. Oct 24, 2022
 Carriage, L. (2022) Get out your glitter and head down the Atlanta Highway – the B-52s are setting out on their final dance party! The Conversation: In-depth analysis, research, news and ideas from leading academics and researchers. Aug 29, 2022
 Carriage, L. (2021) It’s 30 years since Freddie Mercury died. His music is still the soundtrack of our lives. The Conversation: In-depth analysis, research, news and ideas from leading academics and researchers. Nov 24, 2021
 Carriage, L. (2020) John Lennon’s Imagine at 50: a deceptively simple ballad, a lasting emblem of hope. The Conversation: In-depth analysis, research, news and ideas from leading academics and researchers. Sept 9, 2020
 Carriage, L. (2020) On the 50th anniversary of her death, Janis Joplin still ignites. The Conversation: In-depth analysis, research, news and ideas from leading academics and researchers. Oct 2, 2020
 Carriage, L. (2018) Can Anyone Learn To Sing? For most of us the answer is yes. The Conversation: In-depth analysis, research, news and ideas from leading academics and researchers. May 14, 2018

Festival Performances 
 Monterey Jazz Festival, California, USA.
 Brisbane International Jazz Festival, Queensland, Australia.
 Bangalow Music Festival (with Southern Cross Soloists), New South Wales, Australia.
 Creative Jazz, Tāmaki Makaurau Auckland, New Zealand.
 Manly Jazz Festival, New South Wales, Australia.
 Melbourne International Jazz Festival, Victoria, Australia.
 Melbourne International Women’s Jazz Festival, Victoria, Australia.
 Splendour in the Grass, Byron Bay, New South Wales, Australia.
 Spiegeltent, Brisbane Festival, Queensland, Australia.
 Wangaratta Jazz and Blues Festival, Victoria, Australia.
 Woodford Folk Festival, Queensland, Australia.

Awards 

 2022 - Australian Women in Music Humanitarian Award https://womeninmusicawards.com.au/2022-recipients-finalists/
 2019 - Nominated for Vice Chancellor’s Impact Award (Professional Service).
 2016 - 'Weave' Album of the Year, North Coast Entertainment Industry Awards.
 2014 - 'Mandarin Skyline' nominated for a National Bell Award Australia.
 2009 - Citation for Outstanding Contribution to Student Learning. For the creation and establishment of an innovative equity program which provides exceptional support for music students in their development as original artists.  
 
The Higher Education Equity Support Program (HEESP) initiated by Dr Carriage from 2000-2010 offered music students a program of national and international, female visiting artists, who provide mentorship and support through live performances, workshops, private lessons, and open forums. To complement the program, Dr Carriage also created and designed a website which provides additional information such as artist biographies, an alumni section, and links to relevant educational sites. The HEESP project supplements normal course tuition by scheduling artists to perform who are specialists in the musical genre in which the students are currently studying.  Testimonial 

"One of Dr Carriage’s most significant educational initiatives has been her work on issues of gender and professional equity. In 1998, in her first year at SCU, Dr Carriage began to develop the Higher Education Equity Program (now known as ‘HEESP’) to address gender inequities within the Music program (in which she was the only female full time staff member until the mid 2000s). The program was the first of its kind within an Australian tertiary music education establishment.
 
Dr Carriage has been tireless in her efforts to develop a network of professional artists and alumni able to provide SCU students with role models, mentorship and inspiration, Many of these individuals have participated in SCU’s ‘Women In Music: Visiting Artists Program’ and have influenced the Contemporary Music program’s unit content and orientation to address gender issues and have helped create an expectation of equality and dialogue amongst her students. After ten years of operation, HEESP remained an exemplar for other programs, contributing to improved educational experiences and academic outcomes for women students, and addressing problems of access associated with higher education provision in regional areas." 

Professor Philip Hayward, Department of Contemporary Music Studies, Macquarie University, Sydney

Australian Women in Music Awards
The Australian Women in Music Awards is an annual event that celebrates outstanding women in the Australian Music Industry who have made significant and lasting contributions in their chosen field. They commenced in 2018.

|-
| 2021
| Leigh Carriage
| Humanitarian Award
|

External links 
 Official website
 Research Portal
 Linkedin

References 

Academic staff of Southern Cross University
Year of birth missing (living people)
Living people
Sydney Conservatorium of Music alumni